"Never Gonna Let You Go" is a song by American singer Tina Moore. Originally released as a single in May 1995 from her self-titled debut album, the song reached number 27 on the US Billboard Hot R&B/Hip-Hop Songs chart. In August 1997, a UK garage remix of the song by Kelly G was released on the Delirious label and became a top-10 hit in the UK, peaking at number seven on the UK Singles Chart. On the Eurochart Hot 100, it reached number 23 in September 1997. Several remixes are included on the CD and 12-inch formats, such as the 'Tuff Jam Classic Vocal Mix' and 'Warehouse Junkie Mix'.

Critical reception
Larry Flick from Billboard wrote that Moore "skips and slinks over hand-clapping R&B rhythm with a youthful, thoroughly appealing style." He noted that "there are moments when her fluttering range takes on a tone that is notably close to Mariah Carey", and complimented its "festive sing-along chorus." An editor from Daily Record viewed it as "impressive". Music Week rated it four out of five, adding that "this wailing vocal garage track has been lapped up by Kiss 100 and may cross over in the wake of Rosie Gaines." James Hyman from the magazine's RM Dance Update gave it five out of five, picking it as Tune of the Week. He noted that it "bounds along with skipping beats, scat prods, deep probing bassline and instantly recognisable Kelly G vocals that hook most effectively when heard in their looped wailing whiney hi-tempo fashion (familiar from Double 99's 'RIP Groove')." He concluded, "Echoing the classic status of tracks such as Jomanda's 'Got A Love For You' and Roberta Flack's 'Uh-uh ooh ooh' and more recently Rosie Gaines' 'Closer Than Close', this will undoubtedly achieve the chart success it deserves." Ian Hyland from Sunday Mirror rated the track eight out of ten. He added, "All the big labels were fighting to get their hands on this dance monster. Top tune in the same mould as chart biggies Ultra Nate and Rosie Gaines. Watch it fly."

Music video
A music video was produced to promote the single, directed by Daniel Zirilli.

Impact and legacy
DJ Magazine ranked it number 62 in their list of the "Top 100 Club Tunes" in 1998.

MTV Dance placed "Never Gonna Let You Go" at number 92 in their list of "The 100 Biggest 90's Dance Anthems of All Time" in November 2011.

Porcys listed the song at number 54 in their ranking of "100 Singles 1990-1999" in 2012.

In November 2016, UK duo Gorgon City compiled a list of their top UK garage songs for Billboard, with "Never Gonna Let You Go" at number 9.

The Guardian ranked the song at number 11 in their list of "The best UK garage tracks - ranked!" in 2019. They wrote:

Redbull.com included the song in their list of "10 underground UK garage classics that still sound fresh today".

Capital Xtra included the song in their list of "The Best Old-School Garage Anthems of All Time".

Track listing
 CD maxi-single (1997)
 "Never Gonna Let You Go" (Kelly G Bump-N-Go Vocal Mix) (4:12)
 "Never Gonna Let You Go" (Kelly G Bump-N-Go Dub Edit) (3:55)
 "Never Gonna Let You Go" (Tuff Jam Classic Vocal Mix) (5:13)
 "Never Gonna Let You Go" (Tuff Jam UVM Dub) (6:27)
 "Never Gonna Let You Go" (Warehouse Junkie Mix) (5:55)
 "Never Gonna Let You Go" (LP Mix) (4:14)

Charts

Weekly charts

Original version (1995)

Kelly G remix (1997)

Year-end charts

Release history

References

1995 songs
1995 singles
1997 singles
Tina Moore songs
Scotti Brothers Records singles